The 1983 World Table Tennis Championships women's singles was the 37th edition of the women's singles championship.
Cao Yanhua defeated Yang Young-ja in the final by three sets to one, to win the title.

Results

See also
List of World Table Tennis Championships medalists

References

-
1983 in women's table tennis